Anne Howard, Countess of Arundel (née Dacre; 21 March 1557 – 19 April 1630), was an English poetess, noblewoman, and religious conspirator. She lived a life devoted to her son, Thomas Howard, and religion, as she converted to the illegal and underground Catholic Church in England in 1582, in defiance of Queen Elizabeth I's policy of Caesaropapism. She was known to be a "woman of strong character, and of religious desposition…whose influence soon made itself felt upon her husband… the increasing seriousness of his thoughts led him in the direction of Romanism…". She was also known as an author of Christian poetry and for literary works written about her.

Family background
Anne was born in Carlisle, England, on 21 March 1557, the eldest daughter of Thomas Dacre, 4th Baron Dacre of Gilsland, and Elizabeth Leyburne of Cumbria. Following Anne, her mother gave birth to three more children: a son George (but sometimes called Francis), and two sisters, Elizabeth and Mary. George was born in 1562, followed by Mary in 1563, and Elizabeth in 1564. In 1567, Anne's father died; soon after, her mother remarried, becoming the third wife of Thomas Howard, 4th Duke of Norfolk. In September 1567, when Anne was about 10 years old, her mother died during childbirth.

After the death of their mother, Anne and her siblings were essentially brought up and educated by their maternal grandmother, Lady Mounteagle, who had formerly been married to Sir James Leyburn. Her mother and grandmother were both devout Catholics, which had a strong influence on her religious beliefs and actions. Growing up, Anne and her siblings were instructed on religion by a Catholic priest. This was an issue because they were under the rule of Queen Elizabeth I, a Protestant monarch.

Married life
Anne's stepfather, Thomas Howard, eventually obtained the wardship of all the Dacre children. He arranged that George (Francis) was to marry Margaret, the daughter of his second wife. The three Dacre girls were arranged to marry Thomas's three sons: Philip, Thomas, and William.

In 1569, it was arranged for Anne to marry Thomas's eldest son, her stepbrother, Philip Howard, the Earl of Surrey, the Duke's heir. Since both children were only 12 years old at the time, the ceremony was repeated two years later when both the parties reached the age of consent. Philip eventually became the 1st Earl of Arundel. Anne's sister, Elizabeth, married Lord William Howard. Her other sister, Mary, was arranged to marry Lord Thomas Howard, but died before she was “marriageable”. Anne's stepfather, now her father-in-law, discouraged her Catholic inclinations.

They saw little of each other in the early days of their marriage, partly because the earl was a student at Cambridge, and Anne came under the protection of Philip's maternal grandfather, Henry FitzAlan, 12th Earl of Arundel. Following Arundel's death, on 24 February 1580, Anne became the Countess of Arundel. She returned to her husband's London house, where they began to live together, and she gave birth to their two children, Elizabeth and Thomas.

Throughout the beginning of their marriage, Anne and Philip moved continually. They moved from "Audley End to Arundel House, London, to Nonsuch, with occasional visits to the Charterhouse, then known as Howard House". The constant moving occurred for many years until the early 1580s, where they finally settled in Arundel Castle in Sussex where Anne and Philip decided to convert to Roman Catholicism.

Religion and conversion
As a child, Anne learned from her grandmother "a high self esteem and affection for Catholik Religion… great compassion of sick, or otherwise afflicted persons… and a great kindness of the Society of Jesus". During the sixteenth and seventeenth centuries, laws against Catholicism increased and resulted in harsh punishment by Queen Elizabeth I, who ruled as the Protestant Monarch. But despite those laws, Anne converted to Catholicism in 1582. She was converted at the hands of a Marian priest in her Arundel Castle in Sussex. Once word got out about her conversion from Protestantism to Catholicism, Queen Elizabeth I showed strong disapproval and Anne was put under house arrest in the home of Sir Thomas Shirley. While under house arrest in Shirley's home for one whole year, Anne gave birth to her first child, Elizabeth in 1583. 

After Anne was released, she reunited with Philip. In 1584, Philip decided to follow in his wife's footsteps and convert to Roman Catholicism as well. After Queen Elizabeth I heard of this information, she ordered Philip to house arrest, just like she did to Anne. However, unlike his wife, Philip tried to escape from his ordered of house arrest and flee to France in 1585. In his attempt to escape, he was caught at sea and held as prisoner in the London Tower. He was condemned to indefinite imprisonment, in addition to a fine of £10,000. After this, the Queen would not allow Anne to live in London any longer, so she moved to a rental house in Romford, Essex. There, she gave birth to her second child, Thomas Howard, the future 14th Earl of Arundel. Unfortunately, Philip was never able to meet his first and only son because he died in the Tower of London on 19 October 1595.

Widowed life
Once declared a widow in 1595, all of Philip's possessions that were supposed to be Anne's were withheld from her. She had to pay off debts and secure an income for her family by selling her land. For a long time, Anne and her two children lived in poverty, hardly able to support themselves. Years later, after struggles of paying off debt and living a hard life, Anne was able to regain the property that was rightfully hers by the inheritance of her dead husband. With these possessions, she was able to give her children, Elizabeth and Thomas, a proper life. She eventually moved back to Carlisle, where she was born and raised. She took a vow of chastity in 1595 after Philip died, and never remarried. She spent her days in church attendance and other religious observances. She had a passion for helping people in need, especially people who were sick.

In December 1603 Anthony Standen wrote to the Jesuit Robert Persons about the religion of Anne of Denmark. He hoped the Countess of Arundel and other Catholic women would be able to convert her to Catholicism.

She died of natural causes on 19 April 1630 at Shifnal Manor, Shropshire, aged 73, and was buried next to her husband inside the Fitzalan Chapel at their former home, Arundel Castle in Sussex.

In a 1995 homily at Arundel Cathedral, Cardinal Basil Hume said, "I believe that Anne herself achieved the highest degree of sanctity."

Literary works
Anne Howard wrote many different literary works throughout her lifetime, consisting of letters, poems, and journal entries. She wrote of accounts of her life and that of the earl, her husband. Her writing was a "compilation of reminiscences, some of which represent her attempts to recall early stages in her life, while others record the day-to-day life in her household, when she practiced a disciplined and practical piety. Events are overlaid with the emotions that remained with the countess, as in the account 'Of the Queen's hatred towards her'".

There is evidence of poetry that was written by Anne about her imprisoned and deceased husband. They express the sorrow and "submission" of her husband, for whom she refers to as "my sonne". There is also evidence of writing about Anne's grandmother that raised her. All of her poetry was published under her own name.

Ancestry

References

1557 births
1630 deaths
Converts to Roman Catholicism from Anglicanism
English Catholic poets
16th-century English women
16th-century English poets
17th-century English women
17th-century English nobility
17th-century English poets
Howard family (English aristocracy)
16th-century Roman Catholics
17th-century Roman Catholics
Anne
Daughters of barons
English countesses
People from Carlisle, Cumbria